Jumba Yaka Forest Park is a forest park in Central River Division in the Gambia. Established on January 1, 1954, it covers 405 hectares.

The estimate terrain elevation above sea level is 47 metres.

References
  
 

Protected areas established in 1954
Forest parks of the Gambia